"Think for a Minute" is a single by The Housemartins taken from the album London 0 Hull 4. The song reached #18 in the UK Singles Chart.

The single and album versions are quite different – the album track is similar to a lot of The Housemartins early tracks, being guitar, bass and drum based, while the single version is a much more produced version, with piano and trumpet (from Guy Barker).

Charts

References

1986 singles
1986 songs
The Housemartins songs
Go! Discs singles
Songs written by Paul Heaton
Songs written by Stan Cullimore